Paracharactus is a genus of sawflies belonging to the family Tenthredinidae.

Species:
 Paracharactus gracilicornis
 Paracharactus hyalinus

References

Tenthredinidae
Sawfly genera